Poecilasthena panapala is a moth in the family Geometridae. It is found in Australia, including New South Wales.

References

Moths described in 1922
Poecilasthena
Moths of Australia